The San Francisco AIDS Foundation (SFAF) is a nonprofit organization dedicated to providing services for people with HIV/AIDS, with a mission to end the AIDS epidemic in the United States. They were founded in 1982, at the beginning of the AIDS epidemic. SFAF is one of the largest and oldest community-based AIDS service organizations in the United States. SFAF has an 87.67% overall rating, and a 97% accountability & transparency rating, at Charity Navigator.

History
The SFAF was established in April 1982 as the Kaposi's Sarcoma Research and Education Foundation, by Cleve Jones, Marcus Conant, Frank Jacobson, and Richard Keller. They reorganized as the San Francisco AIDS Foundation in 1984.

The SFAF was originally an all volunteer group led by physicians and gay community leaders. It began by providing a hotline service originally called the Kaposi Sarcoma or KS hotline that was later renamed along with the organization. The Hotline was intended to serve as a source of accurate information about the AIDS epidemic. It was initially available in Northern California but the organization's growth would see it expand nationwide. By 1995, the SFAF reported receiving more than 10,000 calls every month on their Northern California AIDS Hotline.

By October 1982 the foundation officially began working with the San Francisco Department of Public Health. Through collaboration the SFAF was able to provide public services meant to educate people about AIDS. By November the foundation was working with the California Department of Health Services to provide the same services to other areas of California. The SFAF conducted a large advertising campaign, placing messages on public transportation, popular newspapers, and strategically placed advertisements in venues and media popular with the gay community. The foundation also worked with journalists to increase awareness and understanding of the epidemic. The media produced by the SFAF focused on risk reduction and safe sex. In particular the Foundation emphasized the use of condoms during anal intercourse for gay men, and cautioned against activities that shared bodily fluid. By 1983 the foundation had reached the point where they could establish a social services department that could offer emergency services to those affected by AIDS and related issues.

Today the SFAF continues its mission in combating AIDS and to eventually end the disease, and has grown large enough be a respected source of information on AIDS as well as support other organizations and programs aside from its advertising efforts. Among the services offered, the SFAF offers sexual health services including a pre-exposure program. Participants in the program are assisted in obtaining medication easily. The SFAF also runs services designed to help with substance abuse such as the Stonewall Project and social support programs aimed at the homeless and people over fifty. In addition the SFAF is a major influence and collaborator on the Getting to Zero initiative.

SFAF has received part of its funding from the annual AIDS Walk SF, which has raised over $80 million for SFAF since the first AIDS Walk in 1987. SFAF additionally funds other local and international HIV/AIDS organizations with proceeds from the walk. AIDS Walk SF severed ties with SFAF after the 2013 walk. SFAF advocates for reducing stigma associated with HIV/AIDS and treatments for it. Congressperson Nancy Pelosi gave tribute to SFAF in October 2004, praising then-executive director Pat Christen. SFAF will open a wellness center in the Castro District in 2015. The 50-Plus Network, developed by Jeff Leiphart, PhD, and Noah Briones, MFT, and currently managed by Vince Crisostomo, offers a growing number of opportunities for older gay men in the San Francisco area to improve health and well-being, connect with peers, and give back to their community.

Publications
 How AIDS Ends: An Anthology from San Francisco AIDS Foundation, Timothy Ray Brown, Jeanne White Ginder and Cleve Jones, foreword by Bill Clinton. (2012)

See also 

 Hank M. Tavera

References

External links
 San Francisco AIDS Foundation website

HIV/AIDS organizations in the United States
Organizations based in San Francisco
1982 establishments in California
LGBT history in San Francisco
1982 in San Francisco
1982 in LGBT history